St Gregory's School may refer to:

 St Gregory's High School, a Catholic High School in Dhaka, Bangladesh
 St Gregory's Catholic School, Royal Tunbridge Wells, Kent, England
 St Gregory's School in Northwood, England, a predecessor of the All Saints Catholic High School, Kirkby
 St Gregory's School in Lagos, Nigeria, founded in 1884 by the Roman Catholic Archdiocese of Lagos
 St Gregory's School in Manhattan, New York, founded in 1913 by St. Gregory the Great Church (Manhattan)
 Saint Gregory's School in Loudonville, New York, a private boys elementary school in the Roman Catholic Diocese of Albany
 St Gregory's School in St. Nazianz, Wisconsin, founded in 1884 by St. Gregory's Church (St. Nazianz, Wisconsin)

See also
 St. Gregory's College (disambiguation)
 St. Gregory's Academy, Elmhurst, Pennsylvania, United States